The Jungle Bar is a region between the rivers Chenab and Ravi in Punjab, Pakistan. It is located in the southern part of Rechna Doab."Bar", in the local language, means a forested area where there are no resources for cultivation, like water. This Bar is named due to the area's Jungle forested area. Almost all the area of this bar used to be part Jhang District, but nowadays it is divided between the districts of Jhang and Toba Tek Singh.

Jungle Bar is a vast area with a number of Punjabi tribes.

References

Regions of Punjab, Pakistan